The Middletown-Norwalk (M-N) Transmission Line is a 69-mile (112 km), 345-kilovolt AC transmission line between Middletown and Norwalk in the U.S. state of Connecticut. Construction began in 2006 with the ground breaking at the Beseck Switching Station and was energized in December 2009.

Route
The M-N Transmission Line begins in Middletown at the Scovill Rock Substation in Middletown, and proceeds west to the Beseck Switching Station in Wallingford.  From Beseck the transmission line continues southwest to the East Devon Substation by overhead wires supported by 105-foot (35 m) pylons.  At East Devon, the line will connect to the nearby Devon Power Station owned by NRG Energy and the Milford Power Company power plant before going underground.  The line will continue underground to the Singer Substation in Bridgeport, where it will connect to the Bridgeport Harbor Generating Station owned by PSE&G, the Bridgeport Energy Plant owned by Duke Energy, and the Bridgeport waste-to-energy plant operated by the Connecticut Resource Recovery Agency.  From Bridgeport, the line will continue southwest, closely following US 1, passing Ash Creek to its terminus at the Norwalk Substation.

To ease environmental and community concerns, portions of the line are being placed underground, while the overhead portions of the line will traverse mainly rural areas. Northeast Utilities and United Illuminating are constructing the line at a cost of $1.3 billion.  As part of the project, UI and NU will reconstruct the existing 115-kilovolt transmission lines located on segments of the M-N line's path.

References

External links
 NU Transmission - Projects:  Middletown-Norwalk Transmission Project

Energy infrastructure completed in 2009
Electric power transmission systems in the United States
Energy infrastructure in Connecticut
Norwalk, Connecticut
Middletown, Connecticut
Buildings and structures in Middlesex County, Connecticut
Buildings and structures in Fairfield County, Connecticut
2009 establishments in Connecticut